The second cabinet of Mauno Koivisto was the 61st government of Finland, which was in office from 26 May 1979 to 19 February 1982.  It was a majority government composed of a coalition between the Social Democrats, the Centre Party, the Swedish People’s Party, and the People’s Democratic League. The government was dissolved on 26 January 1982 due to Prime Minister Mauno Koivisto being elected the 9th President of Finland. 

Koivisto
1979 establishments in Finland
1982 disestablishments in Finland
Cabinets established in 1979
Cabinets disestablished in 1982